Heatwave was a short-lived libertarian socialist journal launched by Charles Radcliffe. Only two issues of the journal were produced, appearing in July and September 1966. The first issue positioned itself as an 'experimental, perhaps slightly crazed libertarian socialist journal', and included a statement of intent: 'HEATWAVE is not a rival to existing publications on the libertarian left, but an addition to the libertarian press and an extension of its ideology, both conscious and unconscious, into new fields. HEATWAVE wants to generate heat in every field. We believe the time is ripe for an explosion of revolutionary energy which would alter the face of the earth. HEATWAVE advocates the use of any and all means that may bring to a climax the crisis of capitalism and authoritarianism, and result in the total extinction of all forms of exploitation or authority.'

The journal's formation was inspired by, and aspired to be the British counterpart of a similar, Chicago based publication, The Rebel Worker, which was associated with the Industrial Workers of the World.

References

Further reading
Rosemont, Franklin and Radcliffe, Charles. Dancin' in the Streets: Anarchists, IWWs, Surrealists, Situationists and Provos in the 1960s as Recorded in the Pages of Rebel Worker and Heatwave. Charles H Kerr. 2005.

External links
Articles on and by Charles Radcliffe and comrades

Anarchist periodicals published in the United Kingdom
Defunct political magazines published in the United Kingdom
Libertarianism in the United Kingdom
Libertarian socialism
Magazines established in 1966
Magazines disestablished in 1966
Socialism in the United Kingdom
Socialist magazines